Forssa BK is a Swedish football club located in Borlänge.

Background
Forssa Bollklubb were founded on 16 April 1934 at Hushagens school.  The club played their first match on 17 May 1934 winning 4–0 against IK Fylking. In 1978 the club played the biggest match in their history against Hammarby IF in Scandia Cup. Forssa BK lost 1–5 before a crowd of 1,240.

Forssa BK currently plays in Division 4 Dalarna which is the sixth tier of Swedish football. They play their home matches at the Maservallen in Borlänge.

The club is affiliated to Dalarnas Fotbollförbund. Forssa BK have competed in the Svenska Cupen on 25 occasions and have played 63 matches in the competition.

Season to season

Footnotes

External links
 Forssa BK – Official website
 Forssa BK on Facebook

Football clubs in Dalarna County